Actor Ichikawa Ebijūrō as Samurai is an ukiyo-e Japanese woodblock print by Osaka-based late Edo period print designer  (fl. c. 1822-1830). The print depicts a scene from a kabuki play featuring Osaka actor  in the role of a samurai. One impression of the print belongs to the permanent collection of the Prince Takamado Gallery of Japanese Art in the Royal Ontario Museum, Canada.

Print details
 Medium:  woodblock print; ink and colour on paper
 Size: {{Nihongo|ōban tate-e|大判竪絵|}}
 Format:  single sheet print 
 Genre: ,  actor print
 Japanese title: 「判官代輝国」「市川蝦十郎」  
 Exhibit title: Actor Ichikawa Ebijūrō as Samurai Date: 3rd month of 1823
 Signature: Shunsho ga [春曙画]   
 Publishers' marks: Tenki [天キ] (Tenmaya Kihei), Yamaichi [山市] 
 Censor seal: none
 Date seal: none
 Credit line: none

Artist
 (fl. 1822–1830) was a Japanese ukiyo-e designer in Osaka. He used the gō art names  (1822–1824),  (1824-1830), . He was not very prolific, and all of his few surviving images are yakusha-e kabuki actor portraits. 

Medium and genre
Kamigata-e were mainly  images of kabuki actors, and were produced almost exclusively by amateur "talented kabuki fans" promoting their favourite actors.

Publisher

The print displays two publisher seals. The firm operated in Osaka from 1816 into the 1850s, and published works by Gigadō Ashiyuki, Konishi Hirosada, Shunbaisai Hokuei, Sadamasu and Ryusai Shigeharu among others. Tenki used various  publisher seals. This version features the kanji character 天 (ten) followed by the katakana character キ (ki) within a rectangle.

The seal on this print is the kanji character 市 (ichi) under a stylized double mountain (pron. yama).

Subject

Ichikawa Ebijūrō I
The inscription to the right of the figure names him as actor Ichikawa Ebijūrō [市川蝦十郎] in the role of Hangandai Terukuni [判官代輝国]. The date of the print indicates that this is Ebijūrō I (c. 1777–1827), the first of seven generations of actors whose line ended in 1929.

He is noted for performing up to seven roles within a single play, as well as for impressive  fight scenes and  costume changes.

Sugawara Denju Tenarai Kagami
The print depicts a scene from the  history play  (The Secrets of Calligraphy), "one of the 3 great masterpieces of Gidayū-kyōgen" (義太夫狂言).Gidayū kyōgen: "Drama originally written for the puppet theater (ningyō jōruri, commonly called Bunraku) and adapted to Kabuki" (Shōriya "Glossary D-G"). Originally written in 1746 for the  puppet theatre by Takeda Izumo I, Miyoshi Shōraku, Namiki Senryū I and Takeda Izumo II, it was first staged for kabuki the following year. Hangandai Terukuni is a minor character who acts as Sugawara's escort and as a representative of the retired Emperor Uda. Hokuchō's print commemorates a performance of the play at Osaka's Kado no Shibai theatre in the third month of 1823.

Image
Ebijūrō is captured in a dramatic mie pose. He stands barefoot, feet planted wide apart, body bent forward at the waist. With a serious expression, he stares into the distance with his body angled in three quarter profile to the right. He appears to have been startled into a defensive pose. His right hand is raised above his head, and in the top-right corner of the image is a -type fan in mid-flight subsequent to having been tossed into the air. His left hand grips the sheath of one of the two swords on his left side, the customary position for samurai.

He wears a dark outer-kimono from which his arms have been removed to increase his mobility. On the upper half of the kimono hanging down below his waist is the character "輝", which starts the name ". His yellow under-kimono is patterned with butterflies or moths. His hair is arranged in a chonmage top-knot, and the string visible around his head indicates that his eboshi hat has been knocked back.

The print's background is completely blank and coloured yellow, which was a particularly common choice for Hokuchō.

Inscription
Along the right side of the print is an inscription written in a style of Japanese calligraphy known as cursive script. , which translates literally as 'grass writing', is a highly stylized form of writing which is typically difficult for those not specifically trained to decipher. Hokuchō's inscription appears as five vertical columns at various heights containing two or three kanji or hiragana characters each. It is read from top to bottom, right to left. A partial transcription is as follows:

 風 侍　や　（kazezamurai ya） 
　　志　?　? (kokorozashi ? ?) 
　　　　疎　? (utou ?)
 ? 役　目　（? yakume）
 ?　升 (? masu)

Copies in other collections
Versions of this print belong to the permanent collections of the following institutions: 
 

 

Related images
Hangandai Terukuni is a popular subject in late Edo period ukiyo-e. He appears in many prints including:
 

 

 

 

 

See also
 Ryūsai Shigeharu - kamigata-e artist
 Utagawa Kunimasu - kamigata-e artist
 Konishi Hirosada - kamigata-e artist
 Bust portrait of Actor Kataoka Ichizō I (Gochōtei Sadamasu II) - kamigata-e print in same collection
 View of Tempōzan Park in Naniwa (Gochōtei Sadamasu) - kamigata-e print in same collection
 Actor Arashi Rikan II as Osome (Ryūsai Shigeharu) - kamigata-e print in same collection
 Three Travellers before a Waterfall (Ryūsai Shigeharu) - kamigata-e print in same collection
 Actor Nakamura Shikan II as Satake Shinjuro (Shungyosai Hokusei) - kamigata-e print in same collection
 Two Actors in Samurai Roles (Gosotei Hirosada) - kamigata-e print in same collection
 Actor Ichikawa Shiko as Kato Yomoshichi (Gosotei Hirosada) - kamigata-e'' print in same collection

Notes

External links

References
 

 

 

 

 

 

 

 

 

 

 

 

 
 

 

 

Ukiyo-e works
Collections of the Royal Ontario Museum
Edo-period works